1999 was Djurgården remoted from Allsvenskan. 
2000 was the first season of the new second division Superettan. Djurgården finished first.

Player statistics
Appearances for competitive matches only

|}

Topscorers

Total

Superettan

Svenska Cupen

Friendlies

Competitions

Overall

Superettan

League table

Results summary

Matches
Kickoff times are in CEST.

2000–01 Svenska Cupen

Friendlies

References

2000
Swedish football clubs 2000 season